Alberta Provincial Highway No. 14X, commonly referred to as Highway 14X, was the designation of a former spur route of Highway 14 in Alberta, Canada. It was a short north-south provincial highway located in Strathcona County between Edmonton and Sherwood Park and is now part of Anthony Henday Drive (Highway 216).

History 
In the early 1950s, Highway 14 was a gravel highway which entered the Edmonton area from the southeast, briefly traveled north-south along Range Road 234, and then turned west and entered Edmonton along Wye Road (76 Avenue) and 82 (Whyte) Avenue.  At the same time, Highway 16 entered region from the east along Township Road 532, briefly turned south along Range Road 234, and then west along Baseline Road into Edmonton where it became 101 Avenue.  When Highway 14 was paved in the mid-1950s, the  section of Range Road 234 connecting Highways 14 and 16 was also paved and became Highway 14X;  in the late 1950s, Highway 16 was realigned to enter Edmonton along 118 Avenue and the former section became Highway 16A. 

In 1968, a cloverleaf interchange was opened at the Highway 14X/14 junction as part of the Sherwood Park Freeway construction. In the early 1970s, Highway 14X and the north-south section of Highway 16A were divided with interchanges being opened at Highway 16 in 1971 and Baseline Road in 1975,  in conjunction with the province establishing a Restricted Development Area around Edmonton which included Highway 14X. In 1999, Highway 14 was realigned to follow Whitemud Drive and as part of the Highway 14 realignment, Highway 14X was renumbered to Highway 216.

Major intersections

References 

014X
Roads in Edmonton
Roads in Strathcona County